Sunday Holiday is a 2017 Indian Malayalam-language comedy-drama film written and directed by Jis Joy. The film features an ensemble cast led by Asif Ali, Sreenivasan, Lal Jose, Aparna Balamurali, Asha Sarath, Dharmajan Bolgatty, Siddique, Bhagath Manuel, Alphy Panjikkaaran and Alencier Ley Lopez. It was produced by Maqtro Pictures. The music was composed by Deepak Dev. The film was released on 14 July 2017, and received positive reviews from critics.

Plot
The film is about a cinema tale, narrated by Unni Mukundan to a famous director David Paul. Unni is a college professor but he dreams to become a scriptwriter in films. Unni first gets rejected quite harshly, but then David regrets his actions and calls him back, asking for him to narrate the story.

Unni narrates the story of Amal from Payyannur. Amal's love life with Sithara met with an unexpected ending as she accepted a marriage proposal. He decides to go to Ernakulam for a job so that he can stay away from his past. He shares a house with V. P. Vipeesh aka Rahul, Vinu and Narayanankutty aka Nakkutty.

The movie shows the things that happen in Amal's life during that phase where he meets Anu a medical student and eventually falls in love with her. Anu reciprocates his feelings as she is saved by Amal when a person tries to abuse her. They decide to get married leaving Sithara fuming in jealousy. The director loves the story and accepts to make the film. The climax shows that Unni was narrating his own life story.

Cast
Asif Ali as Amal
Aparna Balamurali as Anu
Sreenivasan as Unni Mukundan
Lal Jose as David Paul, film director 
Siddique as Narayanankutty Varavelil/ Nakkutty
Asha Sarath as Dr. Sreedhanya
Dharmajan Bolgatty as Rahul / V. P. Vipeesh
Alencier  as Sudhakaran / Amal's father
Alphy Panjikaran as Amal's sister 
Shruthi Ramachandran as Sithara
Bhagath Manuel as J. K.
Nirmal Palazhi as Vinu
Sudheer Karamana as Benny
K. P. A. C. Lalitha as Benny's mother
Preetha Pradeep as Benny's Wife
Kalasala Babu as Unni's father
Pradeep Kottayam as Church Visitor
Sethu Lakshmi as Astrologer
Meghanathan as S.I. Shafeeque K. V.
Vinaya Prasad as Narayanankutty's wife
V. K. Sreeraman as Abdul Salam Hajiyar
Ann Benjamin as Haseena, Hajiyar's daughter / Anu's friend 
Thesni Khan as Shilpa
Shivaji Guruvayoor as Lonappan
Aliyar as himself, dubbing artist
Athira Patel as Unni's Daughter
Nandana Varma as Unni's Daughter
Vidhya Vijayakumar as Amrita 
Fr. Bobby Jose Kattikad as himself
 Nasser Latif as Sithara's uncle
Praveen Parameswar as Ad Film Director
Remya Panicker as Ruby
Jis Joy as a man in bus (cameo appearance)

Soundtrack

Release
Sunday Holiday released in India on 14 July 2017 in 110 theatres across Kerala.

Critical reception
Times Of India reviewer Deepa Soman rated it 3/5 and stated:'Sunday Holiday is a perceptive portrait of a film and that makes it quite unpretentious and feel-good too, which makes it worth your time'.

Box office
The film was declared as a super hit, grossing 20.5 crore from the box office with a budget of 3 crore INR.

References

External links
 
 

2010s Malayalam-language films
Films set in Kerala
Films shot in Thalassery
Films directed by Jis Joy